PPÖ may refer to:
Pfadfinder und Pfadfinderinnen Österreichs (Boy Scouts and Girl Guides of Austria, PPÖ), is the largest Scouting and Guiding organization in Austria
Pirate Party of Austria (Piratenpartei Österreichs, formerly using the abbreviation PPÖ), is the Austrian Pirate Party section